Semantics is a 1977 two-volume book on semantics by Sir John Lyons.

Reception
The book was reviewed by Jonathan Cohen, Östen Dahl, George A. Miller and Katherine Miller.

References

External links
Semantics, vol 1
Semantics, vol 2
1977 non-fiction books
Books in semantics
Cambridge University Press books
Linguistics textbooks